Sowmaeh-ye Sofla (also Romanized as Sowma‘eh-ye Soflá; also known as Şowma‘eh, Şowma‘eh-ye Pā’īn, and Sowme‘eh-ye Pā’īn) is a village in Barvanan-e Sharqi Rural District, Torkamanchay District, Meyaneh County, East Azerbaijan Province, Iran. At the 2006 census, its population was 186, in 45 families.

References 

Populated places in Meyaneh County